The Mack NO -ton 6x6 truck was a heavy 6x6 cargo truck designed in the 1940s by the American manufacturer Mack Trucks. It was used by the U.S. Army as an artillery tractor for heavy artillery during and after World War II. The official U.S. Army designation was: Truck, 7 1/2 ton, 6x6, Prime Mover. Its G-number was (G-532).

History 
In 1940, Mack Trucks started the development of a wheeled artillery tractor for the U.S. Army, with an off-road payload of  tons (6,803 kg), to tow the 155 mm gun, the 8 inch howitzer, the 8 inch gun, and the 240 mm howitzer. A contract for the production of the vehicle was awarded in September 1940, and in January 1942 a vehicle of the NO-1 type towed the first 240 mm howitzer carriage from the Bucyrus plant in South Milwaukee, Wisconsin to the Aberdeen Proving Ground test facility.

The NO-1 was the first in a series of five very similar prime mover vehicles. The NO-2 differed in details, among them a canvas cabin roof (the NO-1 had a metal roof) and the winch behind the front bumper (above the bumper in the NO-1). A total of 403 units of the NO-2 were delivered in 1943. The next prime mover models, which marginally differed from the NO-2, were the NO-3 and NO-6. A total of 1,097 units of these were ordered and delivered in 1943 and 1944. The last of the series was the NO−7 model, of which 188 were delivered in 1944 and 362 in 1945. Several NO-7 were provided after the war to the European armies being rebuilt, including those of United Kingdom, France, Belgium and Netherlands.

The models NO-4 and NO-5 were prototypes of heavy salvage vehicles, equipped with a Gar Wood crane which could swivel to the left and right. Neither model was put in production.

Description 

The vehicle had a typical configuration, with a hooded front engine behind which was a large driver cabin that could seat five soldiers, and a rear cargo area.

The transmission had 5 gears forward and one reverse. The installation of a transfer case with an additional reduction gear allowed high and low gearing (5F1Rx2).
Traction was in all six wheels (6x6), with 14.00-24 tires.

It could be used to assist in placing the gun, or to help moving the vehicle if it was stuck.

Starting with the NO-2 model, at the rear of the cargo compartment a small crane was installed to assist in placing the gun. The maximum towed load of the vehicle was 50,000 lb (22,680 kg)

Variants 
In total 2,053 Mack NO vehicles were built, in 7 variants as described in the following table.

See also 
 List of U.S. military vehicles by supply catalog designation (G-532)
 List of U.S. military vehicles by model number
 Mack Trucks
 Mack NR

References

External links 

 Mack NO 7 1/2 Ton 6x6 Truck (G-532); Olive-Drab website (accessed 2014-02-25)
 MACK NO Trucks Radionerds

NO
Military trucks of the United States
Military vehicles introduced from 1940 to 1944
Soft-skinned vehicles
World War II military vehicles
World War II vehicles of the United States
Motor vehicles manufactured in the United States
Artillery tractors